The Two and Only is the fourth studio album by American country music duo The Bellamy Brothers. It was released in 1979 via Warner Bros. Records/Curb Records. It reached #9 in the US country charts and #12 in Canada.

Three singles were released from the album. "Lovin' On" reached #16 in the US and #25 in the Canadian country charts in 1978. "If I Said You Had a Beautiful Body Would You Hold It Against Me" reached #1 in the US country charts, #24 in the Canadian country charts, #3 in the UK and #2 in Switzerland. "You Ain't Just Whistlin' Dixie" reached #5 in the US and #11 in the Canadian country charts.

Track listing

Musicians
The Bellamy Brothers and the Dizzy Rambler Band
David and Howard Bellamy - lead and harmony vocals, acoustic guitar
Carl Chambers - lead and acoustic guitars
Jesse Chambers - bass guitar
Dannie Jones - steel guitar
Jon LaFrandre - keyboards
Rodney Price, Carlos Vega - drums

Production
Produced and Engineered by Michael Lloyd for Mike Curb Productions.
Second Engineer: Jim Crosby.
Mastered at Artisan by Bob McCloud.
Photography by George Whiteman.

References

External links
All Music

1979 albums
The Bellamy Brothers albums
Warner Records albums
Curb Records albums